Rood (English: Red) is a single by Dutch artist Marco Borsato from his album Symphonica in Rosso. The song was written and produced by John Ewbank. It reached the number-one position in both the Dutch charts (the Dutch Top 40 and the Mega Single Top 100) and the Flemish Ultratop 50.

Chart performance

Weekly charts

Year-end charts

Decade-end charts

References

2006 singles
Dutch Top 40 number-one singles
Ultratop 50 Singles (Flanders) number-one singles
Marco Borsato songs
Universal Music Group singles
Songs written by John Ewbank (composer)
2006 songs